This is a list of all Slovakia national football team results against other national teams to the present day.

Results 
All times are CET (UTC+01:00).

1930s

1939

1940s

1940

1941

1942

1943

1944

1990s

1992
Matches of 1992 took place, while Slovakia was still a part of Czechoslovakia. The team of Slovakia however participated under its own flag and anthem.

1993 
Matches of 1993 took place, while Slovakia was already an independent nation, but due to ongoing qualification for 1994 FIFA World Cup qualification (UEFA), it was represented by and completed the campaign as a joint Czechoslovakia national football team under a title "Representation of Czechs and Slovaks" (RCS). The first official match of modern Slovakia, is therefore a match against United Arab Emirates national football team in 1994.

1994

1995

1996

1997

1998

1999

2000s

2000

2001

2002

2003

2004

2005 

Spain won 6–2 on aggregate.

2006

2007

2008

2009

2010s

2010

2011

2012

2013 

Notes

2014

2015

2016

2017

2018

2019

2020s

2020

2021

2022

2023

Record
All statistics are correct as of 20 November 2022 after a match against Chile.

By competition

By nation

By confederation 

Notes

By year

By location

See also
 Slovakia national football team

Notes

References

External links
 Results – Slovakia Football Federation
 Results of Official Matches Under FIFA

National association football team results
Slovakia national football team